Sherman Island is an ice-covered island of Antarctica about  long and  wide, lying south of Thurston Island in the middle of Peacock Sound. The feature rises above the Abbot Ice Shelf which occupies the sound.

It was delineated from aerial photographs taken by US Navy Operation HIGHJUMP in December 1946, and named by the Advisory Committee on Antarctic Names for Admiral Forrest Sherman, USN, Chief of Naval Operations, when preparations were being made for U.S. Naval support during the forthcoming International Geophysical Year operations.

Maps
 Thurston Island – Jones Mountains. 1:500000 Antarctica Sketch Map. US Geological Survey, 1967.
 Antarctic Digital Database (ADD). Scale 1:250000 topographic map of Antarctica. Scientific Committee on Antarctic Research (SCAR), 1993–2016.

See also 
 Composite Antarctic Gazetteer
 List of Antarctic and sub-Antarctic islands
 List of Antarctic islands south of 60° S 
 SCAR
 Territorial claims in Antarctica

Further reading 
 M.J. Hambrey, P.F. Barker, P.J. Barrett, V. Bowman, B. Davies, J.L. Smellie, M. Tranter, Editors, Antarctic Palaeoenvironments and Earth-Surface Processes
 Cochran, J. & Jacobs, S. & Tinto, K. & Bell, Robin. (2014) Bathymetric and oceanic controls on Abbot Ice Shelf thickness and stability, The Cryosphere. 8. 877–889. 10.5194/tc-8-877-2014
 J.A. GRIGGS, J.L. BAMBER, Antarctic ice-shelf thickness from satellite radar altimetry, Journal of Glaciology, Vol. 57, No. 203, 2011, P 485

External links 

 Sherman Island on USGS website
 Sherman Island on SCAR website
 Sherman Island area satellite image
 Updated weather for Sherman Island
 Long term weather forecast for Sherman Island

References

Islands of Ellsworth Land